Bradley Cooper (born 1975) is an American actor and filmmaker.

Bradley Cooper or Brad Cooper may also refer to:
Bradley Cooper (athlete) (born 1957), Bahamanian discus thrower
Brad Cooper (born 1954), Australian swimmer
B. Cooper or Brad Cooper (born 1984), American rapper
Brad Cooper (born 1959), Australian businessman who played a central role in the collapse of HIH Insurance